Fuss (German for foot) is a surname. Notable people with the surname include:

 Adam Fuss (born 1961), British photographer
 Benjamin Fuss (born 1990), German footballer
 Nicolas Fuss (1755–1826), Swiss mathematician
 Sonja Fuss (born 1978), German footballer